Left Socialist Action or Left Social Democrats (LevSD ) is a social democratic and democratic socialist political organization in Russia founded in August 2007.

The movement is part of the Union of Democratic Socialists.

Ideology 
According to the statements of one of the leaders of the movement, Nikolay Kavkazsky (also member of Yabloko), the LevSD "is equally far removed from Bolshevik authoritarianism and from the opportunism of modern right-wing social democrats". In the "Declaration of the Socialists of Russia", the current state system, in particular, is characterized as nomenclature, authoritarian and Bonapartist. The document enshrined the social democrats' rejection of clericalism and obscurantism, xenophobia and poverty. According to the movement, social democracy implies a secular state, free democratic elections, support for trade unions, affordable housing and medicine, the introduction of a progressive tax, the correspondence of the minimum wage to the living wage, the rejection of all types of discrimination and respect for nature.

Activities 
LevSD activists participated in many opposition protests: such as Strategy-31, Rallies on Bolotnaya Square, as well as trade union, environmental, feminist, pro-minorities and pro-LGBT rallies.

In 2014, LevSD supported Euromaidan in Ukraine.

In 2022, the activists of the movement participated in anti-war and anti-censorship protests in Russia.

References

2007 establishments in Russia
Opposition to Vladimir Putin
Political organizations based in Russia
Political parties established in 2007
Social democratic parties in Russia